Eye Haïdara (born 7 March 1983) is a French actress from Mali.

Filmography

References

External links

French film actresses
21st-century French actresses
Living people
1983 births